{{DISPLAYTITLE:C16H17NO4}}
The molecular formula C16H17NO4 (molar mass: 287.31 g/mol) may refer to:

 Hamayne, an alkaloid
 Lycorine, a toxic alkaloid
 Noroxymorphone, an opioid
 Pipermethystine, an alkaloid present in the aerial portions of the kava plant
 Tetrahydropapaveroline, a tetrahydroisoquinoline alkaloid

Molecular formulas